"You Don't Have to Worry" is the third single from New Edition's sixth studio album, Home Again (1996). The song was released as the remixed "vocal version" featuring female rapper Missy "Misdemeanor" Elliott and as a B-side with the accompanying second single "I'm Still in Love with You". There is also an alternate version of the remix that features the vocals of Fat Joe, instead of Missy on the 12" single . The single version also features production by Stevie J and co-written credits by R&B group 112, while the album version credits production by Sean "Puffy" Combs and Chucky Thompson. All versions feature Bobby Brown and Ralph Tresvant on lead vocals. Additional rap verses from New Edition members Ronnie DeVoe and Michael Bivins are featured on the track as well.

Music video
The official music video for the song was directed by New Edition member Michael Bivins along with Brian "Black" Luvar. The video premiered in December 1996 and received heavy airplay on BET.

Track listings and formats
 CD single
 "You Don't Have to Worry" (No Rap Version Single Edit) — 3:49   
 "You Don't Have to Worry" (No Rap Version Radio Edit) — 4:21   
 "You Don't Have to Worry" (Vocal Version featuring Missy) — 5:21   
 "You Don't Have to Worry" (Vocal Version featuring Fat Joe) — 5:13   
 "You Don't Have to Worry" (TV Track) — 5:20   
 "You Don't Have to Worry" (Instrumental) — 5:19   
 "You Don't Have to Worry" (A Cappella Version featuring Missy) — 5:17   
 "You Don't Have to Worry" (A Cappella Version featuring Fat Joe) — 2:51

 12" vinyl
 "You Don't Have to Worry" (featuring Missy Elliott) 
 "You Don't Have to Worry" (featuring Fat Joe)    
 "You Don't Have to Worry" (Acappella Version) (featuring Missy Elliott)    
 "You Don't Have to Worry"  
 "You Don't Have to Worry"
 "You Don't Have to Worry" (Acappella Version) (featuring Fat Joe)

 1997 promo vinyl
 "You Don't Have to Worry" (Missy Mix) — 4:26   
 "You Don't Have to Worry" (Fat Joe Mix) — 4:26   
 "You Don't Have to Worry" (LP Mix Clean) — 4:42   
 "You Don't Have to Worry" (LP Instrumental Mix) — 5:20

Chart performance

References

1996 singles
1996 songs
New Edition songs
Missy Elliott songs
MCA Records singles
Music videos directed by Michael Bivins
Music videos directed by Brian Luvar
Songs written by Missy Elliott
Songs written by Daron Jones
Songs written by Sean Combs
Songs written by Jadakiss
Songs written by James Brown
Songs written by Quinnes Parker
Songs written by Slim (singer)
Songs written by Chucky Thompson
Songs written by Heavy D